Indian Fort Hill is a summit in Barnstable County, Massachusetts. It is located north-northwest of Chatham Port in the Town of Chatham. Great Hill is located southwest of Indian Fort Hill.

References

Mountains of Massachusetts
Mountains of Barnstable County, Massachusetts